Shahajibapu Patil is an Indian politician serving as Member of the Maharashtra Legislative Assembly from Sangola Vidhan Sabha constituency as a member of Shiv Sena. He have a degree in law. 

He deserted Shiva Sena during 2022 Maharashtra political crisis and joined rebel party politician Eknath Shinde. He along with more than 40 MLAs camped in Guwahati. During this time his a phone conversation with his follower gone viral on social media in which he described buty of Redison blue hotel, its scenery of mountains.

Positions held
 2019: Elected to Maharashtra Legislative Assembly

References

External links
  Shivsena Home Page 

Year of birth missing (living people)
Living people
Members of the Maharashtra Legislative Assembly
Shiv Sena politicians